The Douglas XFD was a carrier-based biplane fighter aircraft designed for the United States Navy, and the first fighter to be built by the Douglas Aircraft Company. A victim of changing requirements, no production was undertaken.

Design and development
The XFD was designed to the U.S. Navy's Bureau of Aeronautics (BuAer) Specification No. 311, requesting a carrier-based two-seater biplane fighter. On June 30, 1932, the Navy ordered the XFD, Vought XF3U, and Curtiss XF12C for testing.

The first naval fighter designed by Douglas Aircraft, the XFD was constructed of metal, with a fabric outer covering. The crew sat in tandem in a single bay, enclosed by a long canopy. The aircraft had fixed conventional landing gear, and was designed to be armed with two  machine guns, one fixed in the cowling and the other on a flexible mount for the observer. A  bomb load could be carried. Powered was supplied by a Pratt & Whitney R-1535 Twin Wasp Junior radial engine.

Operational history
The XFD-1 prototype first flew in January 1933; it was delivered to the U.S. Navy for trials at Naval Air Station Anacostia in June 1933, within four days of the delivery of the Vought XF3U-1; evaluations of the types were undertaken between June 18, 1933 and August 14, 1934. While the XFD-1's performance was considered to be acceptable, the U.S. Navy's operational requirements were already changing to see the two-seat fighter concept falling out of favor, the scout bomber being considered more useful for the Navy's needs, and accordingly after the end of the XFD-1's flight trials no further orders were placed for the type.

Specifications

See also

References

Notes

Citations

Bibliography

Cancelled military aircraft projects of the United States
F01D
1930s United States fighter aircraft
Single-engined tractor aircraft
Biplanes
Carrier-based aircraft
Aircraft first flown in 1933